is a Japanese tokusatsu television series. It was Toei Company Limited's eighteenth production of the Super Sentai metaseries. It aired from February 18, 1994 to February 24, 1995, following its predecessor Gosei Sentai Dairanger and was replaced by Chouriki Sentai Ohranger. The name given to this series by Toei for international distribution is Ninja Rangers.

Action footage from the series was used in the third season of Mighty Morphin Power Rangers and Mighty Morphin Alien Rangers. The core Zyuranger costumes from Kyōryū Sentai Zyuranger and the Kiba Ranger costume from Gosei Sentai Dairanger were mainly used in the third season of Mighty Morphin Power Rangers while the core Kakuranger costumes were used in Mighty Morphin Alien Rangers. In January 2016, Shout! Factory announced that they would release "Ninja Sentai Kakuranger: The Complete Series" on DVD in North America. Kakuranger was released on DVD in North America on May 17, 2016. This is the third Super Sentai Series to be released in North America. In addition on May 22, 2017, Shout! streamed the series on their website.

Plot
Four hundred years ago, the ninja and the Youkai had a great war. The legendary Sarutobi Sasuke and four other ninjas sealed the Youkai Commander Nurarihyon and all his Youkai's energies away in a cave protected by the "Seal Door". In the present, one of the few remaining Youkai, Kappa, tricks Sarutobi Sasuke and Kirigakure Saizo's descendants, Saizou and Sasuke, into releasing the Youkai by opening the "Seal Door". Now these two, joined by three other descendants of great ninjas, become the Kakuranger to fight the reinvigorated Youkai with the aid of the Sanshinshou. However, the Kakurangers have their work cut out for them as the Youkai are slowly being united under one banner.

Characters

Kakurangers
Each member is named after a legendary ninja and master of the  ninjutsu. Before entering battle, they say "Hiding among the people and punishing the evil! Ninja Sentai Kakuranger has arrived!!" (人に隠れて悪を斬る! 忍者戦隊カクレンジャー見参! Hito ni kakurete aku o kiru! Ninja Sentai Kakurenjā, kenzan!) before giving a thumb's down, saying "Justice will prevail!" (成敗 Seibai!).
 26 years old, descendant of Sarutobi Sasuke. The team's agile second-in-command. He is a dirty-minded, reckless hothead whose faults are outweighed by being good-hearted and loyal. While looking for his Shinobi Scroll, Sasuke's time with Reika allows him to gain a resolve to protect all life on Earth from the Youkai. He has a little cousin named Kosuke. He corresponds to Sun Wukong of Saiyuki.:Sasuke is portrayed by Teruaki Ogawa (小川 輝晃 Ogawa Teruaki).
 Ninja Arts (忍法 Ninpō) technique: Cloning.
 Hidden Style (隠流 Kakure Ryū) attacks: Full Moon Cut (満月斬り Mangetsu Giri), Lightning Cut (雷鳴斬 Raimeizan), On Saru Nin: Flaming Whirlwind (オン・サル・ニン 火炎つむじの術 On Saru Nin: Kaen Tsumuji no Jutsu).
 15 years old (16 during Part II of the series), the twenty-fourth protector of the Seal Door and the first female leader of a Sentai. She descended from the feudal lords who eagerly answered the call to fight the Youkai. Tsuruhime comes off a strong girl with a displeasure of her upbringing as a rich girl. She is looking for her missing father, Hakumenro. She once fought alongside two other girls, Yukiyo & Tsukiyo, as one of the 'Punishment Sisters'. While searching for her Hidden Scroll, Tsuruhime underwent a test of her character to understand her position as team leader. She corresponds to Xuanzang. During the events of Kaizoku Sentai Gokaiger, Tsuruhime was originally supposed to grant the Greater Power of the Kakurangers to the Gokaigers, which was Ninjaman. However the Gokaigers managed to discover and release Ninjaman before being approached by Tsuruhime. Tsuruhime then decided to allow Ninjaman to grant the Greater Power to the Gokaigers, impressed at the fact that they found and freed him on their own.
Tsuruhime is portrayed by Satomi Hirose (広瀬 仁美 Hirose Satomi). As a child, Tsuruhime is portrayed by Mao Inoue (井上 真央 Inoue Mao).
 Ninja Arts (忍法 Ninpō) technique: Transformation.
 Hidden Style (隠流 Kakure Ryū) attacks: Z-Cut (くの字斬り Ku no Ji Kiri), Dance of the Paper Cranes (折り鶴の舞 Oridzuru no Mai), Falling Cherry Blossoms (花吹雪 Hanafubuki), On Tsuru Nin: Dance of Paper Cranes (オン・ツル・ニン 白鶴の舞 On Tsuru Nin: Hakutsuru no Mai).
 22 years old, descendant of Kirigakure Saizo. He is constantly chattering and an easily flattered man who thinks he's a lot smarter than he really is. He likes to help other people, making him popular among children. He is unlucky in most things and His way of talking is a little feminine. He corresponds to Sha Wujing.:Saizou is portrayed by Hiroshi Tsuchida (土田 大 Tsuchida Hiroshi).
 Ninja Arts (忍法 Ninpō) technique: Water Running.
 Hidden Style (隠流 Kakure Ryū) attack: Square Cut (正方の陣 Seihō no Jin), Big Wave (ビッグウエーブ Biggu Ueibu), On Okami Nin: Water Tornado Technique (オン・オオカミ・ニン 水竜巻の術 On Ōkami Nin: Mizu Tatsumaki no Jutsu).
 24 years old, descendant of Miyoshi Seikai. He likes video games. He refuses to battle at the beginning, but when he saw Rokurokubi steal children, he changes his mind. He is driven by his desire for food, sleep and women. He is indecisive, but inherits an unusual strength from his ancestor. He corresponds to Zhu Bajie.:Seikai is portrayed by Shu Kawai (河合 秀 Kawai Shū).
 Ninja Arts (忍法 Ninpō) technique: Enlargement.
 Hidden Style (隠流 Kakure Ryū) attack: Triangle Cut (三段斬り Sandan Kiri), Whirlwind (旋風 Tsumujikaze).
 20 years old, descendant of Jiraiya. He is a Japanese-American ninja from Los Angeles trained by his guardian Gali after his father, who was a police officer, was killed by the Youkai (but was later revealed to by Gali himself). Jiraiya stands out among the characters because he speaks English frequently (which at first caused both teasing and confusion with the other team members) He learns Japanese as the show progresses. He is a big fan of Japanese ninja movies. During his first appearance, he was helping the Youkai. In reality, he did so to steal four scrolls, previously stolen by Azukiarai, to allow him and the other three Kakurangers (besides Sasuke, who already had his) to become Juushou. He expresses combination of a cowboy/surfer persona. He is the pure fighter of the group. Although he knows Earth-based Ninja Arts, he prefers to fight with his martial art skills. While finding his Shinobi Scroll, Jiraiya was forced to battle Gali, who revealed himself as the man who killed his father and served the Youkai. After the bloody battle between them, Jiraiya learned why Gali did it, as well as hoping Jiraiya would kill him. Both the deaths of Zashiki-warashi and the two men he had known since childhood gave Jiraiya a reason to fight the Youkai. He is the only member with no "Journey to the West" corresponding character, but Yulong the horse also has no "Kakuranger" corresponding character.:Jiraiya is portrayed by Kane Kosugi (ケイン・コスギ Kein Kosugi).
 Ninja Arts (忍法 Ninpō) technique: Ground Merging/Earth Swimming.
 Hidden Style (隠流 Kakure Ryū) attacks: Shooting Star (流れ星 Nagareboshi), Three Kick (スリーキック Surī Kikku), Lightning Drop (雷光 落とし Raikō Otoshi), On Gama Nin: Rock Hell Technique (オン・ガマ・ニン 岩地獄の術 On Gama Nin: Iwa Jigoku no Jutsu).

Arsenal 
 Doron Changer (ドロンチェンジャー Doron Chenjā): The Inrō-like transformation devices of the Kakurangers given to them by their ancestors; the Changers hold each Ranger's individual coins and generate their suits. Can also be used to detect Youkai. By using the henshin call "Super Transformation! Doron Changer!" (スーパー変化ドロンチェンジャー! Sūpā Henge Doron Chenjā!), the user transforms into a Kakuranger. In the final episode, they were used to reseal the Youkai behind the Seal Door.
 Secret Sword Kakuremaru (秘剣カクレマル Hiken Kakuremaru, Hidden Circle): The main weapons of the Kakurangers. They are the swords passed down from their ancestors that change form whenever the Kakurangers transform. Each Kakuranger is able to perform their own special attack with their sword - Ninja Red's Hidden Style Full Moon Slash (満月斬り Kakure Ryu Mangetsu Kiri). The Rangers' primary team attack, Lightning Wave (雷光波 Raikōha), involves all five Rangers crossing their swords in mid-air, which sends a powerful blast that destroys the Youkai.
 Kakulaser (カクレイザー Kakureizā): The pistol sidearms for the Kakurangers. They can be converted into a Laser Knife (レイザーナイフ Reizā Naifu) mode.
 Ninja Knuckle (シノビナックル Shinobi Nakkuru): A gauntlet that each Kakuranger possesses. It increases punching power and the Kakurangers' individual weapons can be attached to it, as well as a grappling device.
 Red Slicer (レッドスライサー Reddo Suraisā): Ninja Red's personal weapon that can be used as either a boomerang or a shield.
 White Beak (ホワイトビーク Howaito Bīku): A dagger that serves as Ninja White's personal weapon.
 Blue Shot (ブルーショット Burū Shotto): A squirt gun that serves as Ninja Blue's personal weapon.
 Yellow Claw (イエロークロー Ierō Kurō): A retractable claw that serves as Ninja Yellow's personal weapon.
 Black Bow (ブラックボウ Burakku Bō): A small crossbow with arrows that serves as Ninja Black's personal weapon.
 Shark Machines: The team's motorcycles. One of the team's finishing moves is Shark Driver (シャークドライバー Shāku Doraibā), where the Kakurangers combine their Shark Machines, and Ninja Red's Shark Bleeder is launched towards the enemy.
 Shark Bleeder (シャークブリッダー Shaāku Buriddā): Ninja Red's motorcycle.
 Shark Launcher (シャークランチャー Shāku Ranchā): Ninja Blue's motorcycle with a sidecar for Ninja White.
 Shark Slider (シャークスライダー Shāku Suraidā): Ninja Yellow's motorcycle with a sidecar for Ninja Black.
 Kakuranger Ball (カクレンジャーボール Kakurenjā Bōru): Color-changing football used for the Kakure Shoot (カクレシュート Kakure Shūto), the team's second finishing move. It's a football that's passed from member to member and changes colors in the process before it's finally kicked into the Youkai.
 Thunder Sword Hikarimaru (雷鳴剣ヒカリマル Raimeiken Hikarimaru, Light Round): A short sword given to Sasuke by Tsubasamaru during the final battle with Junior, used with the Kakuremaru sword to perform the finishing attack Hidden Style Thunder Cut (隠流・雷鳴斬 Kakure Ryū Raimei Kiri). The sword can be used to summon Tsubasamaru.
 Nekomaru (ネコマル Nekomaru): A sentient cat-spirit that assumed the form of a bus that functions as the Kakurangers' base, and able to fly through the air. It also serves as a crepe shop when the Kakurangers are not on a mission. Its license plate number is "56-56", that in goroawase can be read as Gorogoro (the Japanese onomatopoeic word for purring).
 Hidden Scrolls (忍之巻 Shinobi no Maki): These scrolls contain the essence of Kakure Style ninpo, and allows the Kakurangers to control Muteki Shogun, Kakure Daishogun, and Tsubasamaru freely. In the battle two thousand years ago, the Hidden Scrolls were scattered until the current Kakurangers were able to find them on their own Journey of Trials. Sasuke and Jiraiya found their scrolls on separate mountains, Tsuruhime found hers near a waterfall, and Saizou and Seikai found theirs in the city.

Giant Beast Generals 
The Kakurangers can transform into the five Giant Beast Generals (巨大獣将 Kyodai Jūshō) by the command "Hidden Style: Giant Beast General Technique!" (隠流巨大獣将の術 Kakure Ryū Kyodai Jūshō no Jutsu). The Beast Generals' group attacks include the Vacuum Hurricane (真空ハリケーン Shinkū Harikēn) and Hidden Style Secret Technique: Big Bang (隠流奥義ビッグバン Kakure Ryū Ōgi Biggu Ban).

 Red Saruder (レッドサルダー Reddo Sarudā): Ninja Red's Beast General form, armed with the Saruder Slicer. Forms the body of Muteki Shogun and stores the helmet. Its name is a pun on the Japanese word for monkey (猿 saru).
 White Kark (ホワイトカーク Howaito Kāku): Ninja White's Beast General form, armed with the Kark Beaks. Forms Muteki Shogun's left arm. Its name is a pun on the Japanese word for crane (鶴 kaku, this is an alternate reading, used only in compounds).
 Blue Logan (ブルーロウガン Burū Rōgan): Ninja Blue's Beast General form, armed with the Logan Shaft. Forms Muteki Shogun's right arm. Its name is a pun on the Japanese word for wolf (狼 rō, this is an alternate reading, used only in compounds).
 Yellow Kumard (イエロークマード Ierō Kumādo): Ninja Yellow's Beast General form, armed with the Kumard Claw. Forms Muteki Shogun's right leg. Its name is a pun on the Japanese word for bear (熊 kuma).
 Black Gammer (ブラックガンマー Burakku Ganmā): Ninja Black's Beast General form, armed with the Gammer Bow. Forms Muteki Shogun's left leg. Its name is a pun on the Japanese word for toad (蝦蟇 gama).

Beast General Fighters 
Beast General Fighters (獣将ファイター Jūshō Faitā) are lightly armored battle versions of the Giant Beast Generals, summoned from each Kakuranger's Doron Changer medal when the "Hidden Style: Beast General Fighter" (隠流獣将ファイターの術 Kakure Ryū - Jūshō Faitā no Jutsu) is performed. While able to act on their own, the Kakurangers can fuse into their respective Beast General Fighter to increase their power by performing the "Beast General Fighter Gattai". Their team attacks include the Fighter Crush (ファイタークラッシュ Faitā Kurasshu) and the Super Kakure Shoot (スーパーカクレシュート Sūpā Kakure Shūto).

 Battle Saruder (バトルサルダー Batoru Sarudā): Ninja Red's Beast General Fighter form, armed with the Saruder Claw (サルダークロー Sarudā Kurō).
 Battle Kark (バトルカーク Batoru Kāku): Ninja White's Beast General Fighter form, armed with the Kark Cut (カークカット Kāku Katto).
 Battle Logan (バトルロウガン Batoru Rogan): Ninja Blue's Beast General Fighter form, armed with the Logan Kicker (ロウガンキック Rōgan Kikku).
 Battle Kumard (バトルクマード Batoru Kumādo): Ninja Yellow's Beast General Fighter form, armed with the Kumard Head (クマードヘッド Kumādo Heddo).
 Battle Gammer (バトルガンマー Batoru Ganmā): Ninja Black's Juushou Fighter form, armed with the Gammer Three Attack (ガンマースリーアタック Ganmā Surī Atakku).

Super Ninja Beasts 
After finding the Hidden Scrolls, which hold many of the Kakurangers' techniques and powers, the Kakurangers were able to call forth and pilot the mighty Super Ninja Beasts (超忍獣 Chōninjū). These mighty creatures are called from the Hidden Scrolls with the command "Hidden Style: Super Ninja Beast Technique!" (隠流超忍獣の術 Kakure Ryū - Chōninjū no Jutsu). Although very powerful as separate fighting units, the Beasts can combine to become the last of the God Generals.

 God Saruder (ゴッドサルダー Goddo Sarudā): Piloted by Ninja Red, armed with the connecting Saruder Double Swords (サルダーダブルソード Sarudā Daburu Sōdo) to use its Twin Sword Cut (二刀斬 Nitō Kiri) finisher. Forms Kakure Daishogun's right arm. Helped out in Gaoranger vs. Super Sentai.
 God Kark (ゴッドカーク Goddo Kāku): Piloted by Ninja White, armed with the Flying Beam (フライングビーム Furaingu Bīmu). Forms Kakure Daishogun's head.
 God Logan (ゴッドロウガン Goddo Rogan): Piloted by Ninja Blue, armed with the Logan Attack (ロウガンアタック Rōgan Atakku) and Eye Beams. Forms Kakure Daishogun's left arm.
 God Kumard (ゴッドクマード Goddo Kumādo): Piloted by Ninja Yellow, armed with Eye Beams and Stomp Attack. Forms Kakure Daishogun's upper torso, and the toy version carries the right hand in its underbelly and sports the left hand as its tail.
 God Gammer (ゴッドガンマー Goddo Ganmā): Piloted by Ninja Black, armed with Gammer Fire (ガンマーファイヤー Ganmā Faiyā) and Gammer Dynamite (ガンマーダイナマイト Ganmā Dainamaito) (release several smaller versions of itself, which would latch on a Youkai and explode). Forms Kakure Daishogun's lower torso and legs.

Three God Generals 
The Three God Generals (三神将 Sanshinshō), despite the Kakurangers' earlier notions, are sentient mecha who were originally three divine sages that developed a shinobi spell that defeated Daimaou and the Youkai two millennia ago. Having transcended their humanity, the Three God Generals aided the Kakurangers' ancestors in their fight with the Youkai. Though the Kakurangers' ninpo allowed them to revive Muteki Shogun by combining their Beast Generals forms, they obtain the Shinobi Scrolls needed to freely summon him, Tsubasamaru, and Kakure Daishogun. The Three God Generals represents the Shin-Gi-Tai (心技体 Heart-Technique-Body) essence of Hidden Style ninpo, and love, hope, and courage which are the opposite of Daimaou who represents hatred.

Muteki Shogun 
Ninja Combination Muteki Shogun (忍者合体無敵将軍 Ninja Gattai Muteki Shōgun, "Invincible General") is the first of the Three God Generals to be awakened, representing the "body" of Hidden Style ninpo and hibernating as the Wind Illusion Castle (風雲幻城 Fūun Maboroshijō) before the Kakurangers' ancestors give the Kakurangers their Doron Changers and give them the means to revive Muteki Shogun by combining their Giant Beast General forms. The castle also contains a stone altar of the Three God Generals that the three beings can speak through. Muteki Shogun is armed with the mighty Flaming Shogun Sword (火炎将軍剣 Kaen Shōgun Ken), which can defeat nearly any Youkai with its flaming blade and has a hilt which resembles a shachihoko. The sword can be shrunk to human size for the Kakurangers to use in desperate situations. The "Shinobi" kanji medal on his chest can deflect certain youkai attacks. Some of Muteki Shogun's attacks are the Shogun Flower Spray (将軍花吹雪 Shōgun Hanafubuki) and the Flaming Shogun Wave (炎将軍波 Kaen Shogunha). Whenever Muteki Shogun defeats a Youkai, he gives a salute and a nod while saying, "Rest in peace. (南無三 Namusan, literally, Hail to Thee, Three Treasures)"

 By combining Tsubasamaru with Muteki Shogun, they become Super Ninja Combination Super Muteki Shogun (超忍者合体ス－パ－無敵将軍 Chō Ninja Gattai Sūpā Muteki Shōgun, "Super Invincible General"). Super Muteki Shogun can unleash the Muteki Cannon Full Discharge (無敵キャノン一斉射撃 Muteki Kyanon Issei Shageki) attack to finish off Youkai.

Tsubasamaru 
Sacred Ninja Beast Tsubasamaru (聖忍獣ツバサマル Seininjū Tsubasamaru) is giant mythical white falcon with a 85.6 metres (281 ft) wingspan that represents the "heart" of Hidden Style ninpo and can combine with either Muteki Shogun or Kakure Daishogun to increase their power. Tsubasamaru first appeared to help the Kakurangers against Umibozu on his own whim before they obtain the Shinobi Scrolls needed to freely summon him. In episode 31, he spoke to Sasuke and gave him the thunder sword, Hikarimaru.

Kakure Daishogun 
Five-God Combination Kakure Daishogun (五神合体隠大将軍 Goshin Gattai Kakure Daishōgun, "Hidden Grand General"), is the last of the Three God Generals to be revealed, representing the "technique" of Hidden Style ninpo and composed of the five Super Ninja Beasts. His fists are weapons, performing the God Hammer Punch (ゴッドハンマーパンチ Goddo Hanmā Panchi) with the right arm and using the left arm for the God Burst Chop (ゴッドバーストチョップ Goddo Bāsuto Choppu). The Iron Fist God Finish (鉄拳ゴッドフィニッシュ Tekken Goddo Finisshu) is performed when the two attacks are used together.

 By combining Tsubasamaru with Kakure Daishogun, they become Winged Combination Super Kakure Daishogun (翼合体スーパー隠大将軍 Tsubasa Gattai Sūpā Kakure Daishōgun, "Super Hidden Grand General") who uses the Flying Kick (フライングキック Furaingu Kikku). While his usual finishing move is Iron Fist Flying Finish (鉄拳フライングフィニッシュ Tekken Furaingu Finisshu), Super Kakure Daishogun used a variation called the Iron First Flying Finish Saruder Special against the Youkai Amanojaku.

Allies

Ninjaman 
Ninjaman (ニンジャマン Ninjaman, 36-50, 52 & 53), despite being a bit of a high-strong klutz, is the pupil of the Sanshinshou who battles the Youkai a millennium ago. However, tricked by Daimaoh into hurting humans on the notion that they were Youkai in disguise, Ninjaman gets sent into space within a Jar of Seals that only those of the Tsuruhime line can shatter. Once returning to Earth, Ninjaman is found by Junichi and his sister Mitsuko before the three find themselves attacked by the Youkai Bakuki under orders from Daimaoh to capture Ninjaman to become the Youkai leader's retainer. Luckily, once freed by Tsuruhime, Ninjaman becomes an ally to the Kakurangers. After Daimaoh's defeat, Ninjaman departs with his masters and says goodbye to the Kakurangers. However, this time resulting from not holding back, Ninjaman is sealed again for a few decades before being freed by the Gokaigers and helping them receive the Greater power of his Kakuranger friends.

As a ninja master, Ninjaman wields a katana, the Ninja Sword (ニンジャソード Ninja Sōdo), and had a wide array of Ninja Arts at his command, including the "Art of Fire Escape", and size manipulation to aid his mentors and the Kakurangers in their fights. He can ride on a cloud called the Kintou Cloud. Whenever a Youkai calls him a "Novice" (青二才 Ao Nisai), Ninjaman gets angry enough to change into his true form, Samuraiman (サムライマン Samuraiman), by the command "Anger Explosion!!" (悪女爆烈 Ikari Bakuretsu). In this form, connecting his katana with its sheath to form the powerful Samurai Javelin (サムライジャベリン Samurai Jaberin), Samuraiman creates explosive energy spheres formed from his rage in his ultimate attack, Samurai Rage Bomber (サムライ激怒ボンバー Samurai Gekido Bonbā), or the Samurai Rage Slash (Samurai Gekido Giri) with the Samurai Javelin.

During the events of Kaizoku Sentai Gokaiger, Ninjaman was freed from a pot by the Gokaigers. Once freed, he decided to observe the Gokaigers to see if the team was worthy of the Greater Power of the Gokaigers. Eventually they impressed him enough to grant them the Greater Power, which turned out to be himself.

Before entering battle, he says "Ally of Justice, Ninjaman!".

Ninjaman is voiced by Kazuki Yao (矢尾 一樹 Yao Kazuki).

Koshakushi 
Kōshakushi (講釈師 1-24 & 39) is a kimono-wearing anchorman who served as the series narrator. During episode 39, Kōshakushi and his news crew wanted to know more about the Kakurangers, getting into their personal lives. But they followed a pair of Dorodoros to Junior's mansion, learning of Nopperabo's revival ability until Daimou sensed them and sicced the Dorodoros on them. While the others escaped, Kōshakushi was caught and thrown off a bridge, though he managed to survive.

Kōshakushi is portrayed by Enjou Sanyuutei (三遊亭 圓丈 Sanyūtei Enjō).

Sandayu 
Sandayu Momochi (百地三太夫 Momochi Sandayū, 1-3, 5, 9, 23, 24, 26, 28, 30 & 31) is a ninja master who instructs the Kakurangers on their abilities and is considered dangerous by the Youkai. Being a former student of Hakamenrou, Sandayu aided the Kakurangers when Gasha Dokuro set up the beginning phase of Daimaou's resurrection, warning the Kakurangers they are not ready to face him. But the Kakurangers refused to accept that and are quickly defeated before Sandayuu had Tsubasamaru bring them the Wind Illusion Castle to see the Sanshinshou, revealing their origins and that obtaining the Shinobi Scrolls are needed to stop Daimaoh. While Tsuruhime was looking for her Shinobi Scroll, she is found by Sandayuu and taken to her family's mansion. There, Sandayuu uses her quest as a test to prove her worth as the Kakurangers' leader and heir to her family legacy, providing her with karakuri replicas of her teammates. He briefly meets with Hakamenrou, whom he was working with, to rescue Tsuruhime when Hakamenrou fought her. However, Junior learned of this and impaled Sandayuu with his own katana. Sandayuu lived long enough from the wound to tell the team to form Kakure Daishogun during their final fight with Gashadokuro and give them his final words.

Sandayu Momochi is portrayed by Akira Sakamoto (坂本 あきら Sakamoto Akira).

Zashiki-warashi 
Zashiki-warashi (ザシキワリシ Zashikiwarashi, 18): A Youkai mushroom child who uses mushrooms to perform spells and wants to make children happy, pursued by Junior who planned to turn him evil. Though Ninja Black attempts to protect him from Gashadokuro, Zashiki-warashi turns him in and undergoes a ritual to turn him into an evil version of his true form. Attacking the city in his enlarged form, Zashiki-warashi overpowers the Beast General Fighters until hearing the cries of the children he befriended manages to restore him to normal. However, horrified at what he done to the city, Zashiki-warashi attempts to fight Gashadokuro and is mortally wounded. Found by Jiraiya, Zashiki-warashi turns back into a mushroom.

Zashiki-warashi's human form is portrayed by Kazuyuki Makino while his Youkai form is voiced by Sumiyo Sawada.

Reika 
Reika (玲花 Reika, 25) was a butterfly given human form by Sasuke's Shinobi Scroll to find him as he arrives to Nasukogen, tending to his wounds after he was attacked by Junior. However, wanting to experience being human, Reika ends up going on a detour to Rindo Lake Family Farm while trying to get Sasuke to lighten up. But when mortally wounded by Ittanmomen while trying to get a bunny to safety, Reika directs Sasuke to the scroll's location before dying and reverting to her true form as she dissolves.

Reika is portrayed by Reiko Chiba (千葉 麗子 Chiba Reiko), who previously portrayed Mei in Kyōryū Sentai Zyuranger.

Bun 
Bun (ブン Bun, 26, 30, 31, 42-44 & 51-53) is a Youkai who despises the Youkai way due to being teased by other Youkai. Said to be Sandayuu's apprentice, Bun has been helping Hakamenrou in secret, rescuing Sasuke and company when they are blasted into the raging river. In the end of series, he remains with Hakamenrou after he is finally freed of Daimaou's control.

Bun is portrayed by Yasuyuki Fukuba.

Taro and Jiro 
Taro and Jiro (太郎と次郎 Tarō to Jirō, 26, 30, 31, 42-44 & 52) are the twin sons of vassals to Tsuruhime's family, becoming her adopted brothers when their parents, who were once vassals of the Tsuruhime house, had died. When Tsuruhime's father Yoshiteru learned of Daimaou, the brothers accompanied him into the Youkai World to kill the demon before he could be fully revived. However, Taro and Jiro were captured and turned into German Shepherds after Yoshiteru agreed to serve Daimaou in return for their lives spared. However, though the brothers can temporarily regain human form, they can only do it once with a second time killing them. As a result, after escaping back to their world with Bun, Taro and Jiro looked after Tsuruhime in their master's place before revealing their true nature to Sasuke in order to give him Hakamenro's findings on Daradara while asking him to tell Tsuruhime that they will protect her from the shadows. The two eventually return and sacrifice themselves to free Hakumenro from the Youkai.

Taro is portrayed by Daisuke Tsuchiya and Jiro is portrayed by Keisuke Tsuchiya, the latter previously portraying Kazu of Gosei Sentai Dairanger and the former playing Kazu's clone in one episode of Dairanger.

Gali 
Gali (ガリ Gari, 28 & 29) was a Japanese American karate teacher who is an old friend of Jiraiya's father, but also an indentured servant of Nue who is infused with Yokai energy and armed with a claw weapon. Gali's servitude started in 1986 when his daughter is mortally wounded after a car crash, accepting Nue's offer to save his child in return to murder Jiraiya's father. Though he committed the deed, Gali realized the consequences of orphaning Jiraiya. As penance, black mailed into continuing Nue's dirty work, Gali becomes Jiraiya's guardian and taught him martial arts with the hope that his student might kill him. Gali's intent was achieved when Nue sends him after Jiraiya when he was looking for his Shinobi Scroll, revealing truth of his father's murder to have Jiraiya fight him without restraint. Though Jiraiya could not kill him at the last minute, a mortally wounded Gali reveals the truth behind the murder and, in his final words, asks his student to defeat those who use others from the shadows. Soon after, Gali later buried by Jiraiya out of respect.

Gali is portrayed by Sho Kosugi.

Hakumenro 
Hakumenro (白面郎 Hakumenrō, "White Masked Man") is an armored samurai who is revealed to be Tsuruhime's father Yoshiteru. Ten years prior, Yoshiteru researched the Youkai and learned of Daimaou's existence. Fearing the danger that would occur if Daimaou is revived, Yoshiteru is forced to leave his young daughter behind as he attempted to destroy Daimaou before he could return. However, with Taro and Jiro captured, Yoshiteru was forced to aid Daimaou as his tactician Hakumenro. However, Hakumenro uses his servitude as a ruse to uncover Daimaou's weakness. Upon arriving to oversee the final steps of Daimaou's arrival, with the Youkai's son Gashadokuro distrustful of him, Hakumenro is forced to fight his own daughter to keep face while arranging for her safety by his former student, Sandayuu, with orders to make the Kakurangers believe that he is beyond redemption. However, due to Daradara's creation as he attempts to find out the clone's weakness, Hakumenro learns that Daimaou knew of his true intentions yet allowed his presence until he served his purpose. Before being captured by Daimaou, he left a clue for Sasuke that showed him how to defeat Daradara, as well as a map Daimaou's hideout. Though turned into stone by a furious Daimaou over his role in the Youkai's defeat, Daimaou gave Hakumenro to Yamauba as her trump card against the Kakurangers. However, after Tarou and Jirou sacrificed themselves to save him, Yoshiteru is reunited with his daughter.

Hakumenro is portrayed by Takayuki Godai, which previously portrayed Takayuki Hiba/Vul Eagle II from Taiyo Sentai Sun Vulcan.

Yamazaki Sisters 
Yukiyo and Tsukiyo Yamazaki (山咲 雪代と月代 Yamazaki Yukiyo to Tsukiyo, 35) are a pair of sisters who are Tsuruhime's childhood friends and are of a ninja family. As a result, treating Tsuruhime as family, the three of them formed a Sukeban Deka-like group called the Punishment Sailor Sisters who put bullies in their place. When their little sister Hanayo told them of strange events going on at her school, Yukiyo and Tsukiyo are reunited with Tsuruhime as they reformed the Punishment Sailor Sisters to go after Kamaitachi. Soon after, the Yamazaki Sisters thank Tsuruhime for helping them while asking her to call if she ever gets in trouble.

The Punishment Sailor Sisters is a parody of tokusatsu show "Yūgen Jikkōu Sisters Chouchoutrian" (有言実行三姉妹シュシュトリアン Three Sisters of Action), the last entry in the Toei Fushigi Comedy Series with references to Sailor Moon and Crayon Shin-Chan which Yamazaki Sister actresses Noriko Tanaka and Kei Ishibashi as well as Tsuruhime's actress, Satomi Hirose, were all a part of.

Youkai Army Corps
The  were sealed away 400 years ago by the Kakurangers' ancestors and have now changed their forms to keep up with the times. Most Youkai have a human form and use the Ninja Arts themselves. When defeated, they summon lightning made of human despair and misery to strike them, causing them to grow into giants.

Daimaou 
Daimaou (大魔王 Daimaō, Great Demon King, 23, 24, & 30-53) is a 1,199-year-old Youkai born from the amassed hatred of humans who originally led the Youkai Army Corps before being sealed in the Demon Seal Gate long ago by the Sanshinshou in their original human forms. He also played a role in Ninjaman's sealing and exile a thousand years prior by tricking the hero into attacking humans. In present day, Daimaou has his son Gashadokuro set up preparations for his coming into the human world by gathering children's souls to begin a ritual to resurrect him within a month's time. Though Super Kakure Daishogun destroyed it, the Seal Door reformed itself and Daimaou emerges, turning the altar into his base of operations. When Ninjaman returns, Daimaou employs Bakuki to capture the ninja to make him into his retainer for his own agenda. But as Kakurangers got to free Ninjaman, Daimaou decides to let his target be at the moment though he briefly battles the Kakurangers when they ruined his 1,200th birthday party prior to falling back after being overwhelmed by Super Muteki Shogun.

After his 1,200th birthday, Daimaou gained the power to spawn clones of himself as he created Daradara to aid him in wiping out the Sanshinshou by putting them in a predicament through Daradara siphoning the powers of Ninjaman and four of the Kakurangers. However, due to Hakamenrou giving Ninja Red the means to ruin his scheme with Junior's manor destroyed in the process and managing to escape after being wounded by a combination of Super Muteki Shogun's Muteki Cannon Full Discharge and Super Kakure Daishogun's Iron Fist Flying Finish, Daimaou turns the human into stone before establishing himself in a new base of operations: The flying skull fortress Skull Castle (ガイコツ城 Gaikotsujō) with plans to build the Youkai Kingdom on Earth and destroy the Kakurangers. After the death of younger brother Daidarabotchi, having severed his ties to him and their sister long ago so he can focus on establishing the Youkai Kingdom, Daimaou decides to employ his sister in a scheme to have Tsuruhime fall into despair. But when the plan failed, crashing the Skull Castle on them, Daimaou provokes the Kakurangers into killing him so the evil comprising his body would consume humanity to renew the Youkai. But when the Three God Generals instructs the Kakurangers to capture him without transforming, Daimaou ups the ante before the ninja realize the Seal Door is the collective heart of humanity. Though he attempted to escape capture, Daimaou is gravely weakened by the Three God Generals and Ninjaman before being entombed behind the Seal Door where the Youkai are reconstituted.

Daimaou is voiced by Hidekatsu Shibata (柴田 秀勝 Shibata Hidekatsu).

Nurarihyon 
Nurarihyon (ヌラリヒョン Nurarihyon, 1) is a Youkai who attempted to unite the Youkai army years ago after Daimaou's sealing. However, Nurarihyon ended up being defeated by the ancestors of the Kakurangers and sealed away.

Voiced by Yoshimasa Chida (千田 義正 Chida Yoshimasa).

Gashadokuro 
Gashadokuro (ガシャドクロ, 14-31) is an infamous Youkai who is one of their race's leading figures, a brute who happily slaughters any human he comes across and loves to rock but plays the piano when he is in a bad mood. He normally appears to the Kakurangers in the guise of Young Noble Junior (貴公子ジュニア Kikōshi Junia), a bleached blonde leather punk, but can revert to his true militant skeleton form when pumped. Uniting the Youkai under him, Junior is bent on killing off most of the humans to create a Youkai paradise. He made his first direct attack on the Kakurangers with the Shuten Douji brothers. He then made it personal for the Kakurangers by murdering Zashiki-warashi after failing to turn him evil. Though they almost got him during the trap he set up with Tsuchigumo, Junior escapes via a hot-air balloon. Junior eventually begins to carry out the ritual to summon his father Daimaoh back into the world, sending Umibozu to capture five children to begin the ritual and using his music to petrify the remaining ten to complete the ritual. As a result, Gashadokuro is infused with Daimaoh's power and is beyond the Kakurangers' ability to fight as he takes the skull-like altar he created on a building and the surrounding district into the sky beyond the Kakurangers' reach so Daimaoh's resurrection can be uninterrupted as he turn the humans trapped in the barrier to stone. While Gashadokuro appears to be completely heartless to even his lackeys and more relentless in combat, he does have some respect for the Kakuranger, as seen when he allowed his Dorodoros to give water to the Kappa-ized Seikai and Saizou to fight Nue.

Once all the Kakurangers had obtained the Shinobi Scrolls, Junior assumes his true form to battle the Chounin Beasts and stop them from destroying the Sealed Door. However, he is overpowered by them until Hakamenrou intervened. The fact that he had to be saved by the very human whom Daimaou prizes above him drove Junior to have Hakamenrou prove himself to him by killing the Kakurangers. But after mortally wounding Sandayuu when he aided Hakamenrou in saving the Kakurangers, Junior assumes his true form and overpowered the Kakurangers at first until Sasuke receives Hikarimaru to defeat Gashadokuro. But Gashadokuro refuse to accept defeat and enlarges, fighting the Chounin Beasts once again with the laser cannon he had Yugami commission for him. With this new gear, he gained an attack called "Crush Beam". But the tables turned when the team form Kakure Daishogun, and then Super Kakure Daishogun, stripping off his gear before killing him. Soon after, Daimaou states that Gashadokuro was no more than a fool to think he would be his heir though vowed to avenge him nonetheless. The mansion Gashadokuro had occupied served as his father's base of operations before it was eventually destroyed.

Young Noble Junior/Gashadokuro is portrayed and voiced by Kenichi Endō.

Dr. Yugami 
Dr. Yugami (ユガミ博士 Yugami-hakase, 12-16, 20, 30 & 31): A Youkai scientist who enjoys the suffering of children and develop various weapons to aid his kind. Originally under the employ of Tengu, Yugami used the boys that Tengu kidnapped to create the Youkai Replicas. But after Tengu's defeat, Yugami flees from the town and eventually enters the service of Junior, providing the Youkai prince with mechanical weapons and armor for the other Youkai serving him. He appeared to cheer Gasha Dokuro on during the final stages of their plan until he was horrified to see his master destroyed. He was killed by a slim piece of the Seal Door which was shattered by Super Kakure Daishogun

Dr. Yugami is portrayed by Noboru Akima.

Nue 
Nue (ヌエ Nue, 27-29) is a legend among the Youkai who abandoned his "undignified" archaic appearance for a new form that combines elements of an eagle, a lion, and a snake with the power of tigers undiminished through the ages. The source of his power came from the tattoo on his left shoulder. Around the year 1986, Nue founded an organization of assassins in Los Angeles and enlisted the services of Gali to eliminate Jiraiya's father when he stumbled upon his activities.

Seeing Gashadokuro unfit to lead the Youkai, Nue appears as an emissary of Daimaou to deal with Saizou and Sekai during their Shinobi Scroll search by turning them into the lowest hierarchy of Kappa. From there, Nue planned to have the two kill each other so the survivor can become human again. But they two overcame their plight and fight Nue, with the aid of the Dorodoro, to change them back. After killing the Dorodoro and defeating Muteki Shogun, an enlarged Nue battles Ninja Blue and Ninja Yellow as their obtain their Hidden Scrolls and left the Youkai buried in the confrontation with their Super Ninja Beasts . However, Nue survived and sent his assassin Gali, to handle Jiraiya for him. Once Gali died, Nue resurfaced with intend to kill Jiraiya personally. However, with Ninja Black gaining God Gammer, Nue is destroyed by the assembled Super Ninja Beasts attacked with Tsubasamaru supporting them.

Nue is voiced by Tesshō Genda (玄田 哲章 Genda Tesshō).

Yamamba 
Yamamba (ヤマンバ Yamanba, 50-52): The younger sister of Daimaou, Yamamba lived in the mountains with their brother Daidarabotchi where she feeds on lost travelers she while in the guise of an innkeeper named Grandma. When the Kakurangers arrive to their domain after abducting five children that she disguised as chickens, Yamamba attempts to ask Daimaou to join her and Daidarabotchi in killing the ninjas. But when Daimaou refuses, Yamamba decides to handle the trap personally. But Ninja Red manages to save the children, with Yamamba forced to retreat to Daimaou after Daidarabotchi's death. Her hatred towards the Kakurangers allows Daimaou to gives her a power boost that transforms her into a more combat-oriented form. In her new form, Yamamba is sent by Daimaou in a scheme to harvest the rage of sadness of people using the soulless Hakumenro in a scheme to put Tsuruhime on the brink of despair. Yamamba and the Flower Kunoichi-Gumi hold the male Kakurangers off, but Jiro and Taro intervene as they take Hakumenro after she enlarged. While Yamamba uses the Youkai energy lightning from the storm to make herself invincible against Ninjaman and the Three God Generals, the Kakurangers' positive emotions dissolve the cloud with Yamamba destroyed by Samuraiman, Super Muteki Shogun, and Kakure Daishogun.

Yamamba is voiced by Haruko Kitahama (北浜晴子 Kitahama Haruko).

Daidarabotchi 
Daidarabotchi (ダイダラボッチ Daidarabotchi, 50): A giant armored globe-themed Youkai who is the younger brother of Daimaou, upset by his brother disowning him and his sister, who disguised himself as the mountain Yamamba established her inn by. He also poses as the manager of his sister's inn when not needed to be her eyes and ears in the countryside. Daidarabotchi and Yamamba planned to get rid of the Kakurangers one by one by replacing a member with fakes, but Ninja Red managed to use his shadow clones to destroy the fakes before Daidarabotchi surfaced to fight him in God Saruder. Luckily Ninjaman took over before becoming Samuraiman as he, Muteki Shogun, and Super Kakure Daishogun destroy Daidarabotchi.

Daidarabotchi is voiced by Hisao Egawa (江川 央生 Egawa Hisao).

Flowery Kunoichi Team 
The Flowery Kunoichi Team (花のくノ一組 Hana no Kunoichi Gumi, 15, 16 & 20-53) are Gashadokuro's personal ninja team he created from cats. They are cruel, skilled kunoichis armed with Ninja Magic, and are capable of disguise. They each transform by the command "Battle Change!" (バトル変化 Batoru Henge) and use various Ninpo like Flower Storm, Flower Illusion, Flower Bomb, Kunoichi Missile, and Flower Fantasy. Before entering battle, they say, "The Flowery Kunoichi Team are here!".

Outside of fighting, the kunoichi reside within their personal indoor swimming pool deck for leisure. The Flowery Kunoichi Team first make themselves known to the Kakurangers when Junior sends them to support the Shuten Doji brothers. They later enact a scheme by Junior to take out the Kakurangers one-by-one starting with Sasuke. With Dr. Yugami providing radio silence to render the Kakuranger unable to contact his team, the Flowery Kunoichi Team trick Sasuke to discard his Doron Changer to easily kill him. However, Muteki Shogun intervened by giving Sasuke his Blazing Shogun Sword to force the kunoichi to retreat. After Junior's death, the Flower Kunoichi Team serve under Daimaoh. The Three God Generals turned them back into cats during the finale.

 Ayame (菖蒲, "Iris") : Ayame wears a deep blue uniform.
 Sakura (桜, "Cherry Blossom") : Sakura wears a pink uniform.
 Suiren (睡蓮, "Water Lily") : Suiren wears an olive green uniform.
 Yuri (百合, "Lily") : Yuri wears an orange uniform.
 Ran (蘭, "Orchid"): Ran wears a purple uniform.

Dorodoro 
The Dorodoro (ドロドロ Dorodoro) are lowest form of Youkai who serve mainly as grunts. Though they have warped, Kodama-like faces and are clad in light-blue tights, Dorodoro can "mold" themselves into human form. The Dorodoro have a fear of Nue, as he would not hesitate to kill them if they get out of line with him yet a group of them sacrificed themselves to aid Saizou and Seikai while the two Kakurangers were turned into lesser Youkai like themselves.

Minor Youkai 
 Kappa (カッパ Kappa, 1, 2, 12 & 53): A Youkai who is master of Cucumber Bomb and Phantom Space Ninpou. Posing a Bespectacled Man (眼鏡の男 Megane no Otoko) in pilot attire, Kappa tricked Sasuke and Saizou into breaking the Sealing Door so the Youkai can return to power. Though he escaped Muteki Shogun, Kappa's attempt to kill the Kakurangers for making Rokurokubi cry ends with him killed when sliced down the middle by Red Saruder's Saruder Slicer. Kappa was later resurrected by Tengu with a large, curved, silver arm blade in place of his right arm and had metal boots on his feet. He faded once Tengu was killed. Appears during the series' end credits.
 Rokurokubi (ロクロクビ Rokurokubi, 1, 2 & 53): Kappa's wife, whose octopus-like head can detach from her body. Posing as a young Sunglasses Woman (サングラスの女 sangurasu no onna) who can extend her neck, Rokurokubi used an arcade building at the Tokyo Amusement Park as a front to make a living. However, she kidnapped Sekai and a youth who reminds her of her long dead son. When the Kakurangers intervene, keeping up with Nekomaru before it eludes her, Rokurokubi's head enlarged to fight Red Saruder while her body battled the other Kakurangers. But when the body was destroyed by Ninja White, Rokurokubi was dying as a result before being destroyed in the explosion brought by Kappa's death. Appears during the series' end credits.
 Oboroguruma (オボログルマ Oboroguruma, 1, 3, 12 & 53): A oxen cart Youkai who evolved into a taxi in modern times with use of the Exhaust Bullet and Honking Flatulence Ninpo. Posing as a taxi cab driver (運転手 untenshu), Oboroguruma is one of Azukiarai's flunkies and is motivated to help him due to the abused he suffered from humans over the years. He was chasing a guy for not paying the fare when attacked by the Kakurangers before being saved by Jiraiya and believing there were still humans to respected his kind. But once learning that Jiraiya used him to gain the scrolls, Oboroguruma personally sought to kill him until Jiraiya became Ninja Black. Oboroguruma then decided to destroy the entire city in rage, overpowering Red Saruder until Ninja Black obtained the other scrolls with the Beast Generals destroying Oboroguruma with the "Vacuum Hurricane". Oboroguruma was later resurrected by Tengu with a large cannon was mounted onto his back. He faded once Tengu was killed. Appears during the series' end credits.
 Azukiarai (アズキアライ Azukiarai, 1, 3, 4, 12, 34, 36 & 53): A garbage-based lizard youkai who ends his sentences with "shoki" and is a master of the Illusionary Trash Can, Trash Can Vacuum and Azuki Ball Ninpo. With his underlings, Azukiarai sets up his base of operations in the resident police department as its chief after kidnapping the previous one when he was snooping into their affairs. He also took four of the Jusho Ninpo scrolls four centuries. When the Kakurangers regain the scrolls, Azukiarai abuses his authority to arrest Sekai for jay walking so he can capture Saizo, Tsuruhime, and Jiraiya when they try to rescue him. While he and his group have a party to celebrate while have their way with their captives, Azukiarai finds Sasuke infiltrated the party to free his friends. Though Azukiarai used the real chief of police as a human shield, the interference of the man's son Shigeru allowed them to defeat Azukiarai. Though he traps them in his trashcan so can burn them with a bonfire, the Beast Generals break free and form Muteki Shogun to finish him off. A replica of Azukiarai with a right forearm cannon was created by Dr. Yugami using Masao as the Youkai Replica's core, ceasing to be once Tengu is destroyed. Appears during the series' end credits.
 Nurikabe (ヌリカベ Nurikabe, 1, 5, 6 & 12): A brick-wall youkai who posed as a Varsity Jacket Man (スタジャン男 Sutajan Otoko) and uses the Brick Hurricane and Wall Crush Ninpo. Nurikabe plays a maze game with his brother Mokumokuren where they bet on which of the two humans they abduct escape the trap-filled maze first. When Saizo escapes, Nurikabe loses the bet and takes out his frustration on the boy for losing his gold. When Ninja Blue comes to the boy's aid, Nurikabe uses his Brick Tile transformation Ninpou to fight the Kakurangers before enlarging with Blue Logan defeating him before destroying the manor. Blue Logan was about to destroy Nurikabe when Mokumokuren intervened. Wanting revenge, Nurikabe targeted Tsuruhime before he is destroyed by the Shark Driver attack. Nurikabe was later resurrected by Tengu with a large mechanical pincer arm in place of his right arm. He faded once Tengu was killed. Appears during the series' end credits.
 Mokumokuren (モクモクレン Mokumokuren, 1, 5, 6, 12 & 53): Nurikabe's younger brother, this youkai posed a young Coated Man (コート男 Kōto Otoku) wearing sunglasses. In his true flasher-like form, Mokumokuren has the ability to use genjutsu on humans and various other Ninpo through the many eyes on his belly. He plays a maze game with his brother Nurikabe where they bet on which of the two humans they abduct escape the trap-filled maze first. Though he thanked Saizou for winning with a gold coin, Mokumokuren aided his brother in seeking revenge on the Kakurangers through Tsuruhime. Having fell in love with Tsuruhime, Mokumokuren uses a necklace he and his brother bought under false pretenses to place the kunoichi under his spell to trick her into a legal binding marriage. After a "fixed" Youkai marriage court and Nurikabe's death, Mokumokuren enlarges and is overpowered by White Kark before being destroyed by Muteki Shogun. Mokumokuren was later resurrected by Tengu with a bladed weapon in place of his right hand, fading once Tengu was killed. Appears during the series' end credits.
 Gakitsuki (ガキツキ Gakitsuki, 7, 36 & 53): A hungry ghost youkai with a big mouth and an even bigger appetite. Posing as an overweight Aproned Man (エプロンの男 Epuron no Otoko) with a second mouth on his belly, his true form wielded a giant knife and fork-like weapons while using the Cha Siu Roll and Soybean Cannon Ninpo. While eating at a burger joint, Gakitsuki almost devours Sekai when the others came to his aid. Gakitsuki managed to escape the Shark Drive in the guise of a fly and hid away in Sekai's stomach. From there, Gakitsuki had Sekai start eating large amounts of food in an uncontrollable manner, turning him into a giant fatso before the others learn what happened. After a few failed attempts, the group have to consider learning him behind. However, seeing Sekai in a new light, Tsuruhime assumes the form of a cheeseburger so Sekai can will himself from eating her in order for Gakitsuki to leave him. After being defeated by Ninja White and Ninja Yellow, Gakitsuki enlarges before being destroyed by Muteki Shogun.
 Bakeneko (バケネコ Bakeneko, 8): A buxom white cat youkai who hates humans for their crimes against cats, able to use scratch attacks and Illusion Ninpo along with breathing flame and using a katana. Posing as a young Pet Shop Woman (ペットショップの女 Pettoshoppu no Onna), Bakeneko set up a pet shop that serves as a front for a Yokai restaurant her customers eat the children she captured with her Kamikakushi Ninpo. When the Kakurangers ended up at her manor, Bakeneko attempts to eliminate them after they ate the food she drugged with a paralysis poison. But Sasuke and Tsuruhime saw through it with the former tracking Bakeneko to her restaurant. Though Tsuruhime saved the children, Bakeneko's hold on the children captured the kunoichi while she seemingly killed Ninja Red. After the Kakurangers save their ally from being boiled alive, getting knocked down by Nekomaru, Bakeneko enlarges and battles Red Saruder and White Kark before being destroyed by Muteki Shogun.
 Hitotsume-kozō Bros. (ヒトツメコゾウ兄弟 Hitotsume Kozō Kyōdai, Movie & 53): These trickster Youkai brothers in 70's clothing, the older in red and the younger in white, terrorize Yumiko and Shigeru in getting rid of the house guardian they have at their house until it drove them out with them nearly getting killed by the Kakurangers. They eventually kidnap Shigeru to force Yumiko into disposing of the guardian to complete Oonyuudou's plan. The two later fight the Kakurangers for Oonynuudou with the older brother killed by the Shark Driver attack. The enraged younger brother enlarges alongside Oonyuudou to avenge his brother with his "giant bowling", only to be killed by Red Saruder's Saru Slicer.
 Oonyuudou (オオニュウドウ Ōnyūdō, Movie & 53): A giant elephant/kappa youkai who is the loser son of the Youkai Bank's owner. Annoyed with being seen as a loser, Oonyuudou uses his wand to shrink objects and create his "dream town" to rule over. He uses his tuba to place people under his illusions until the Kakurangers' "Lightning Wave" negated this effect. He tries to shrink Muteki Shogun, but it ends up being returned to normal size when he is killed by the Shogun's sword, with everything he shrunk returning to normal.
 Dorotabo (ドロタボウ Dorotabō, 3, 4, Movie & 9): A cauliflower-like fame-driven Youkai whose kind is scarce due to Japan's modernization, master of the Mud Ball and able to fire beams from his eyes. In the guise of the dead beat slob Mr. Dorota, Dorotabo became obsessed with TV. Using a news program to get 15 minutes of fame, Dorotabo ends up picking a fight with Jiraiya and Saizou before falling back. Upon learning that Jiraiya is on Super Battle Quiz, Dorotabo crashes the program and is challenge to a cage match to the death. After losing to Jiraiya in judo, swordsmanship, and boxing, an enraged Dorotabo enlarges. After being pummeled by Black Gammer, Dorotabo is destroyed by Muteki Shogun.
 Konakijiji (コナキジジイ Konakijijī, 10 & 34): A baby-size elderly Youkai able to expand his body to a human size one, increase his weight, stretch his arms, and use the Rocky Abyss Ninpou. Posing as a gentleman (紳士 shinsei) owner of the Neverland store that served as his base of operations, Konaki-Jiji assumes an infant form to strangle any adult who gets close enough to steal their souls to bring his dolls to life so he can have a family. In order to intercept Konaki-Jiji, Sasuke was drafted to disguised himself as a baby to lure the Youkai. However, Konaki-Jiji is not fooled and has Sasuke captured to show him the fruit of his work. However, as others arrive, Sasuke escapes the deathtrap Konaki-Jiji prepared for him and defeats the Youkai with the Kakure Shoot. Enlarging, Konaki-Jiji is quickly destroyed by Muteki Shogun with the souls returned to their rightful bodies.
 Shirouneri (シロウネリ Shirōneri, 3, 4, Movie, 11 & 53): A dust cloth Tsukumogami-type youkai who is master of the Rag Revolt, Rag Conceal, Rag Mattress Roll, and Rag Dancing Ninpo. Posing as a tattered-capped man (オンボロ帽の男 onboro bou no Otoko) in tacky clothes, Shirouneri lived in an abandoned factory with his rag collection and a magic mirror that he often asked if he is the most fashionable. But when the mirror mentioned that rags are out of season and newer clothes are in, Shirouneri shatters the mirror as he goes prove that everyone else's sense of fashion was wrong. Using his Ninja Art: Rag-a-Morphosis (忍法:ぼろヘンゲン Ninpō: Borohengen), Shirouneri turned numerous clothes into rags which had no worth to the people who desired them. His abilities expanded to the telekinetic control of any rag and turning his right forearm into a weapon. Shirouneri eventually abducted a girl Seikai fell for who was going to ruin his plan with recycling the rags into new clothes, capturing Seikai as well before the other Kakuranger save them. After being defeated by Kakure Shoot, Shirouneri enlarges before being destroyed by Muteki Shogun.
 Tengu (テング Tengu, 12): A long-nosed Youkai who can shooting beams from his eyes and fight with a wind-producing magic fan. Though considered the strongest Yokai, Tengu feels he is being overlooked by his kin and resolves to kill the Kaurangers. To that end, he placed the entire town under his control to use the populace to assist him before sicking the Youkai Replicas on them. When he gets impatient, Tengu enlarges himself and the Youkai Replicas to overwhelm the Beast Generals as he uses Youkai Replicas as shields. However, the Kakurangers summon the Beast General Fighters to even the odds before Muteki Shogun destroys Tengu while slicing his nose off. With Tengu dead, the Yokai Replicas dissolve with the children restored to normal.
 Kanedama (カネダマ Kanedama, 13 & 53): A golden Youkai in robotic armor with a magnet arm attachment, he was originally a benevolent Youkai who brings luck to households before becoming evil and greedy. Posing as a gold robed exorcist named Fukuo Daikichi, Kanedama plants the golden coins Prof. Yugami developed into houses to make a profit and fleece the residents of everything they have. However, only the wife of the baker turned him down and Kanedama attempt to force the woman to reconsider by putting up the ante as the Kakurangers help her out. However, due to getting a bump on the back of his head while fighting the Kakurangers, Kanedama's con is exposed as he laced the entire building with his coins before going after Hiroshi with Sasuke saving the baker's son. Though he uses his Thievery Jutsu to take the Kakurangers' Kakulasers from them, he is defeated by Ninja Red using his Full-Moon Cut on the Yokai. Kanedama quickly enlarged, with the Beast General Fighters delivering a quick beating to Kanedama before destroying him with Fighter Crush. Once he was destroyed, Kanedama's coins faded and his spell was broken.
 Keukegen (ケウケゲン Keukegen, 3-6, Movie, 14, 34 & 53): A mask-adorned hairy Youkai who is able to infect people with diseased hairballs. He also uses a katana and a pair of scissors as weapons. While entertained his fellow Youkai in outing in the form of dancing, Keukegen assumes the form of a quacked doctor named Kueke before the Kakurangers encounter him when they took Seikai to his practice. He is overwhelmed by Beast General Fighters until saved by Gashadokuro. Ending up in Junior's manor, after being beaten up for losing, Keukegen is given an arm-mounted blaster by Prof. Yugami to have an advantage on the Beast General Fighters. Though he traps the Beast Generals and Beast General Fighters to subject them to his Flame Hell (炎地獄 Kaen Jigoku) Ninpo, Keukegen is caught off guard by Battle Kumard as Yellow Kumard comes to his team's aid. Transferring from the Beast Generals to the Beast General Fighters, the Kakurangers destroy the Youkai with Fighter Crush.
 Shuten-Doji brothers (シュテンドウジ兄弟 Shuten-Dōji kyōdai, 15, 16 & 53): A pair of Oni-like Youkai that are heavy sake-drinking masters of the sword, able to fight as a unit with their United Blade fighting style. The Elder red brother has two-horns and carries a flask of sake that he uses to breathe fire. The Younger blue brother is one-horned. They were both imprisoned for killing 100 Youkai while in drunken stupor, sealed away in an underground dungeon built for the most dangerous Youkai. However, the brothers are released by Junior with the condition to kill the Kakurangers for him. With the Flowery Kunoichi Team luring the Kakurangers into the Wandering Forest and separating them, the Shuten-Doji brothers ambush the ninja group. Only Sasuke escaped the trap and managed to free the others before the brothers can turn them into sake. While the others battle the Flowery Kunoichi Team and Dorodoro, Ninja Red counters the Shuten-Doji brothers with his shadow clones before using his Full Moon Cut x 8 on them. Upon enlarging, equipped with armor created by Prof. Yugami with the elder brother using a drill and the younger a buzzsaw, the Shuten-Doji brothers to overwhelm the Beast General Fighters until the elder brother accidentally injuring his younger brother with an attack meant for Battle Saruder. Taking advantage, the Kakurangers form Muteki Shogun to finish the brothers off.
 Amikiri (アミキリ Amikiri, 3-6, Movie & 17): A bladed witch-like Youkai under Junior's command who swore to kill Saizou's bloodline for the fact his ancestor chopped her arm off in a duel, having replaced it with the bladed Demon Sword prosthesis provided by Prof. Yugami, which she used by launching the blade on it like a missile. In the form of a Beautiful Woman with a black gloved prosthetic arm, Amikiri attacked Saizou in their first meeting, cutting his SUV and clothes to pieces but forced to fall back when the other Kakurangers arrive. When Junior kidnaped of a boy named Toru who took picture of her destroying Saizou's SUV, the photos turning out to be poor, Amikiri uses the child to force Saizou into a duel to settle things. Though she overpowers him, Amikiri failed to realize that Toru took more accurate photographs of her fighting style and gave them to the other Kakurangers. Once Ninja Blue is shown the image, he duels Amikiri and defeats her with Square Formation cut. When Amikiri grew, the Kakurangers immediately formed Muteki Shogun to finish off the Youkai with the flaming sword attack.
 Tsuchigumo (ツチグモ Tsuchigumo, 19): A spider Youkai under Junior's command who poses as a middle aged mechanic who drives a tow truck. Capable of shooting out spiderwebs from the arms and mouth while moving at a blinding speed, Tsuchigumo abducts his victims in the dark and takes them the abandoned factory to convert into sausages. His actions were witnessed by a boy named Satoru, who told the Kakurangers of him. On Junior's order when the Kakurangers investigate his garage, Tsuchigumo captures Seikai and Satoru to lure the Kakurangers to his lair. As Sasuke manages to elude the trap and deals with Gashadokuro, the others end up in the chamber Tsuchigumo keeps his victims and are overpowered by the Youkai before Seikai breaks free and uses his Triple Slash to defeat the Youkai. Though he enlarged with a wheel-like ring projecting from his back, Tsuchigumo is overpowered by the Beast General Fighters before Muteki Shogun finished him off. Upon his demise, his victims are freed as Gashadokuro escapes.
 Sarugami (サルガミ Sarugami, 21 & 36): A wicked monkey spirit under Junior's command, dressed in reggae attire, Sarugami assumes the guise of a ninja master named Daigoro Kasumi. With Dorodoro posing as his daughter, ill wife and three soccer kids, Sarugami claims his dojo is failing to trick Saizou and the other Kakurangers into showing off their attacks in a demonstration. Once the demonstration ended, Sarugami and his Dorodoro used what they have learned to defeat the Kakurangers. However, learning that they have been played, the Kakurangers trick Sarugami by teaching him an 6-member variation of the Kakuranger Ball that they turn back on him. Enraged by being outwitted, Sarugami enlarges and is destroyed when Battle Logan takes Battle Saruder's place in the Fighter Crush attack.
 Enra Enra (エンラエンラ Enraenra, 22): A smoke Youkai born from car exhaust, able to transform into smoke at will and feed on carbon monoxide. He wields a variety of gases: laughing, tear gas, and numbing gas. In the form of a soda can, Enra Enra uses his laughing gas to make the populace laugh before he was discovered by Ninja White as the Kakurangers take him to the train tracks. Though he escaped them, Enra Enra is horrified by Nekomaru's added solar panels and smashes them before overwhelming Seikai before resuming his gassing of the city. However, with the aid of Maiko and her brothers, Seikai sucked Enra Enra into a vacuum cleaner. Enra Enra managed to use the Gigantism youjutsu to escape his prison and overwhelms Muteki Shogun while defeating subjecting him with his gases. Enra Enra was about to kill the Kakurangers when Maiko arrives with a machine to freeze the Youkai so the Beast General Fighters can finish him off with the Giant Kakuranger Ball.
 Umibōzu (ウミボウズ Umibōzu, 23 & 53): An arrogant sea Youkai under Junior, Umibozu is a powerful Youkai who breathes fire and is armed with a large sword, anchors and depth charges Umibozu was called to capture five children and petrify them to begin the ritual to resurrect Daimaou. While Junior's music petrifies the other ten needed for the ritual, Umibozu battles the Kakurangers before enlarging after being defeated by Ninja Red to fight as his full power. Overpowering Muteki Shogun, Umibozu defeats the Kakurangers and nearly kills them were it not for Tsubasamaru arriving to even the odds it and Muteki Shogun form Super Muteki Shogun to destroy Umibozu.
 Ittan-momen (イッタンモメン Ittanmomen, 25 & 36): A Youkai hitman who is specialized in strangling via colorful cloths and rides a motorcycle. He is hired by Junior to stop Sasuke from getting his Hidden Scroll. After mortally injuring Reika, his guide to the scroll, Sasuke took her death personally and was bent on gaining the Shinobi Scroll more than ever. Enlarging to stop Sasuke, Ittan-momen uses his blowtorch and cannon arm attachments to incinerate the countryside to take the ninja out. However, Ninja Red managed to knock down the giant Youkai on his own before getting his Hidden Scroll. The summoned God Saruder overwhelms Ittanmomen with Super Muteki Shogun's aid before finishing off.
 Kasabake (カサバケ Kasabake, 26 & 36): A cycloptic umbrella Tsukumogami-type Youkai with a fish-like face whose kind used to live in rainy weather until the creation of parasols allow him his kind to move in the day. He is sent by Junior to hinder Tsuruhime's quest for her Hidden Scroll. But once Tsuruhime obtains her scroll from Jiro and Taro after stopping him from grabbing it, Kasabake enlarges as he finds himself facing God Kark before being destroyed by Super Muteki Shogun.
 Nuppefuhofu (ヌッペフホフ Nuppefuhofu, 32 & 53): A Yokai made of dead flesh who used to live in dark corners and cellars until assuming his current form with his face having a jack-o-lantern wing casing over it. He uses his long tongue to lick the faces off of people and mounts them in his room for display. Posing as a popsicle man, Nuppefuhofu is sent by Daimaou to steal peoples' faces in the dead of night to cause confusion and chaos. Though he and other Kakurangers attempt to stop him, Nuppefuhofu manages to lick Saizou's face off. However, when he attempts to go after the other Kakurangers, Nuppefuhofu is lured into a trap and is defeated by Ninja Blue. Enlarging in retaliation, Nuppefuhofu is destroyed by Super Kakure Daishogun with his victims regaining their faces.
 Amanojaku (アマノジャク Amanojaku, 33): A deceptive Youkai armed with a halberd, he was trapped under Bishamon statue's club within a mountain temple for his rebellious ways until he tricked Sasuke's young cousin Kosuke into freeing him. Assuming the identity of the temple's head priest, Amanojaku plots his revenge on the residents of the town who mocked him over the centuries with special mushrooms to turn them into Amanojaku like himself. He attracted the Kakurangers' attention when he kicked the temple's cat Tama in the way of Nekomaru, stumbling into Amanojaku's scheme. Chasing after Amanojaku when he abducts Kosuke, Ninja Red defeats the Yokai before destroying him with God Saruder.
 Sunakake-Babaa (スナカケババア Sunakake Babā, 34 & 53): While her kind were normally tricksters, with the source of their power coming from their breast size, Sunakake-Babaa uses the sand in her urn for malicious means like her signature Sand Hell attack. She also attempted to marry various Youkai - including Nurikabe, Keukegen, Azukiarai, and Konakijiji - who ended up getting killed off by the Kakurangers before falling in love with Daimaou. In the form of a Painted Lady, using Saizou as a test to gain the power to turn food into sand, Sunakake-Babaa spreads her sand into food to win Daimaou's heart in Operation Leave Everybody Starved at Barren Sand Hell. After being grounded by Nekomaru, Sunakake-Babaa counters the Kakurangers' Kakuranger Ball with her Sunakake Ball before taking her leave. However, taking advantage of her before she learns of his true identity, Saizou poses as Daimaou to learn her secret before taking out her bust. Enlarging with her bust restored before her urn got shattered, Sunakake-Babaa is destroyed by Kakure Daishogun.
 Kamaitachi (カマイタチ Kamaitachi, 35): A weasel youkai posing as an elementary school principal named Itachi, Kamaitachi placed his students under his spell to turn them into Youkai. Alerted to the Kakurangers' presence, Kamaitchi uses the converted students to fight for him. However, having kidnapped their younger sister in the process, Kamaitachi finds himself getting a beat down from Yukiyo and Tsukiyo when they and Tsuruhime reformed the Punishment Sailor Sisters while the other Kakurangers held the Flower Kunoichi off. With Yukiyo and Tsukiyo taking their leave to check on the children, Ninja White finishes the Kamaitachi off before he could enlarge.
 Bakuki (バクキ Bakuki, 36 & 53): A fearsome Baku/vampire bat youkai who uses nightmarish illusions in conjunction with his katana, Bakuki is employed by Daimaou to obtain the Jar of Seals that held Ninjaman so that Daimaou could take him into his ranks. But when the Kakurangers intervene, Bakuki kidnaps a young girl named Mitsuko to hold for ransom at Jigoku Valley. Though appearing that he won, Bakuki the Kakurangers get both the jar and Mitsuko with Hakamenrou taking out of the Yokai's eyes from afar. Enlarged, Bakuki battles the newly freed Ninjaman in his world of illusions and gets the upper hand until provoking his opponent. Weakened by Samuraiman, Bakuki is destroyed by Super Kakure Daishogun's Iron Fist Flying Finish.
 Karakasa (カラカサ Karakasa, 37 & 53): A Western-style umbrella Youkai who came to help celebrate Daimaou's 1200th birthday through dancing, enlisted by the Youkai leader to capture the Kakurangers so she can serve their livers to him. She tricks two pranksters to get Saizo, Sekai, and Jiraiya into putting on special shoes that subject the wearer to obey her every order. Though unable to save the others, Ninja Red rescue Jiraiya with Ninjaman's help with the group using the shoes to find Karakasa at the site of Daimaou's party. Though it turned out to be trap, the actions of Ninjaman and Hakumenrou enable the Kakurangers to escape. Furious as she assumes a fighting form, Karakasa enlarges to fight alongside Daimaou before being abandoned by him prior to her death at the hands of Samuraiman and Kakure Daishogun.
 Ushioni (ウシオニ, 38 & 53): A bull-headed Youkai in a poncho who uses guns rather than brute strength like his ancestors, calling himself the "Youkai Rifleman". Ushioni uses bullets containing his essence to convert those he shoots with rifles into his Ushioni Human slaves to steal precious metals to fund the construction of the Onigashima Land amusement park for the Youkai. Despite Jiraiya disarming him in a gunner's duel, Ushioni's bovine instincts cause him powers up when he sees Ninja Red's suit and defeats the Kakurangers with his brute strength. However, after Ninjaman uses matador-based fighting style to weaken the Youkai, the Kakurangers defeat Ushioni with the Kakuranger Ball. Enlarged and not falling for the matador trick again, Ushioni is destroyed by Samuraiman and Kakure Daishogun with his victims returning to normal.
 Nopperabo (ノッペラボウ Nopperabō, 39 & 53): A patchwork Youkai who was originally silly and content to scaring humans before becoming the Youkai world's most feared killer, able to reconstruct his body. On Daimaou's orders, Nopperabo is sent to kill the Kakurangers and is seemingly destroyed by the Shark Driver attack. But he gets a power boost from Daimaou in the form of built-in weapons: The arm-mounted Noppera Machine Gun, the concealed-kneecap Noppera Missile, and the shoulder-mounted Noppera Rifle. Luring the Kakurangers in a trap, Nopperabo is defeated by Ninja Red and enlarges prior to be destroyed by a combo attack by Battle Saruder using Saruder Claw, Red Saruder throwing him to the ground, and God Saruder using his Twin Sword Slash. But the Youkai quickly reforms with Ninjaman/Samuraiman joining the fray before he and Super Kakure Daishogun destroys him with a Samurai Rage Bomber/Iron Fist Flying Finish combo. Though he reforms again, Nopperabo finds that his stomach is held back by Samuraiman's foot. Without that one piece, Nopperabo could no longer reform completely and thus simply ceased to be.
 Nine-Tailed Kitsune (キュウビノキツネ Kyūbi no Kitsune, 40): A cunning female fox youkai clad in lingerie whose ancestors wandered China and India. A greedy trickster who assumes the form of an old woman, Nine-Tailed Kitsune wanted to take advantage of Daimaou's return to buy real estate for the Youkai that would eventually move into Tokyo. To that end, tricking children into witnessing a fox wedding, 9-Tailed Kitsune uses her personal fox masked Dorodoro to kidnap the children so she can take their parents for all they have. Disguising herself as Sakurako after having the girl abducted, Kyubi no Kitsune captured Tsuruhime to get the bounty Daimaou placed on the kunoichi. However, expecting the turns of events, Tsuruhime ensured her comrades would find the children while she frees herself. Enraged at being deceived, Nine-Tailed Kitsune uses her illusions and shotgun to overwhelm the Kakurangers before being defeated by the Kakuranger Ball. Despite enlarging herself while brandishing a katana, 9-Tailed Kitsune ends up being destroyed by Samuraiman and Super Kakure Daishogun.
 Chouchin-Kozo (チョウチンコゾウ Chōchin Kozō, 41 & 53): A giant firebreathing Chinese lantern Tsukumogami-type Youkai whose ancestors were contend to scare people, having the ability to bring back five spirits who still have lingering attachments to the world. To that end, Chouchin-Kozo handpicks five of the most evil ghosts to fulfill their lingering attachments while causing chaos. However, though four meet the Youkai's expectations, the spirit of Shinya Hanada's grandfather took the place of a homicidal ghost. Upon learning it when celebrating prematurely, Chouchin-Kozo attempts to send the old man back to the afterlife to rectify his mistake before being forced to personally fight the Kakurangers alongside his ghosts. After seeing Shinya able to fight his own battles, the grandfather no longer has regrets as he becomes a flame that weakens Chouchin-Kozo so Ninja Red can defeat him and send his ghosts back. Once enlarged, Chouchin-Kozo battles Kakure Daishogun and Samuraiman before being destroyed by Super Kakure Daishogun with his only regret not seeing a line of victory lanterns.
 Daradara (ダラダラ Daradara, 42-44): A slime-based Youkai created by Daimaou from the contents of an egg he produced from his being as result of his newly gained cloning ability, being essentially an extension of Daimaou's being. Besides producing a deadly ooze that gives humans agonizing deaths, Daradara has the power to suck the power from his opponents and use it as his own, transferring his injuries into his victims. Used in Daimaou's scheme to destroy the Kakurangers and the Sanshinshou while draining them of their powers, Daradara siphoned Ninjaman's power to achieve a Ninjaman-like form with his own Daradara Rage Bomber attack while overpowering Super Kakure Daishogun and Muteki Shogun. Though the Sanshinshou escape from Daradara siphoning their powers, the Youkai terrorizes the city until Daimaou has him fall back to begin the second phase by siphoning the energies of all the Kakurangers save Sasuke. After enlarging to lure the Three God Generals out by destroying the city while subjecting people to his ooze, Daradara assumes an Asura-like form with the helmets of Ninja White, Yellow, Blue, and Black around his head and a variation of their attacks, such as the Black Bow and Kakuranger Ball. However, Daradara had a glaring weakness that Hakamenrou uncovered: That he and Daimaou are spiritually linked. With this knowledge, as the Youkai was fighting the Sanshinshou, Sasuke manages to wound Daimaou enough to force Daradara to cancel his siphoning and revert to his original state. From there, attempting to support Daimaou, Daradara is obliterated by Muteki Shogun and Samuraiman's Flaming Shogun Sword and Samurai Rage Bomber combo.
 Oumukade (オオムカデ Ōmukade, 45 & 53): A giant centipede Youkai in football player-like armor who speaks some English and posing as Santa Claus. He had attacks like Centipede Punch, Centipede Ball, Centipede Missiles. Also possessing the Elder Santa Claus and stealing Santa's delivery truck, his plan was to give Christmas presents containing his centipedes throughout the world, so that kids who are possessed by the centipedes would move in accordance with his orders and cause chaos in the cities, leaving the Youkai free to dominate the world. Using his Santa disguise, he temporarily managed to trick Ninjaman into trying to delivering his centipede presents with Nekomaru, before the Kakurangers came in with Tsubasamaru and stopped Oumukade with the Kakuranger Ball. Turning into a giant, Oumukade is destroyed by Samuraiman's Samurai Raging Slash & Kakure Daishogun's Iron Fist God Finish attacks respectively.
 Mujina (ムジナ Mujina, 46 & 53): A shape-shifting Tanuki who assumed the identity of manga artist Shigeru Mizuki, Mujina waited for a longing and isolated manga lover to buy his work, "The Last Kakuranger". Once that opportunity comes, the Kakurangers find themselves in a surreal dimension where they must follow the manga's script where they are killed by Mujina's hands, as he takes on the forms of a merciless swordsman, a Shanghai spy, a spear-wielding master, an Amazoness, and a Los Angeles cop. However, the child Mujina sold the manga to, Akira, foils the scheme with the Kakurangers returning to their world. Joined by Ninjaman, the Kakurangers defeat Mujina's assassins before he enlarges himself and is weakened by Samuraiman as Super Kakure Daishogun lands the deathblow.
 Kasha (カシャ Kasha, 47 & 53): A pyromaniac youkai, armed with a giant chakram called the "Flaming Wheel", and two shoulder cannons, whose acts of arson resulted in his capture and imprisonment within the Arctic ice. There, prior to being released from his icy prison, Kasha saw an aurora that inspired him to launching a fireworks display into the winter sky to honor Daimaou. Kasha assumed the guise of a caped man and sought the skill of Ginjiro Karatsu to create a hundred fire words, arranging the destruction of Karatsu's fireworks factory to get the trick the old man into helping him. Kasha also forced Katratsu's granddaughter, Nozomi Karatsu, whose parents in killed in the fire the Youkai started, to dress up as a "Little Match Girl" to help him capture children he needed to place in the fireworks. Sasuke intentionally allowed Kasha to capture him in order to find the Youkai's base, with his teammates swapping out the fireworks that Sasuke and the children were in. After getting defeated by Ninja Red's Lightning Cut, an enlarged Kasha is overwhelmed by Samuraiman before being knocked by Super Kakure Daishogun into an enlarged fireworks launcher and literally going out with a bang.
 Yuki-Onna (ユキオンナ Yuki Onna, 48): An ice Youkai whose ancestors used to seduce men with their Fubuki Henshin skills, Yuki-Onna employs snow mandala magic in the Youkai cause by using her breath to turn her victims into snowmen for use in a ritual to cause an eternal winter on the world. After getting her first five victims from athletes, Yuki-Onna gets her sixth in the police officer Mr. Murata. Despite interference from Jiraiya and the Kakurangers, Yuki-Onna gets the "snowman" before learning it is Ninjaman is disguise. Losing her crown before being defeated by Ninja Black, Yuki-Onna enlarges and uses her snowmen constructs to freeze Samuraiman and Kakure Daishogun before Muteki Shogun arrives to thaw his allies. As Muteki Shogun and Samuraiman take out the snowmen, Kakure Daishogun destroys Yuki-Onna and her spell is undone with her death.
 Binbogami (ビンボーガミ Binbōgami, 49 & 53): A clown-faced youkai who was born from the resentment of a greedy moneylender who lost his fortune during an uprising. To keep with the times, Binbogami gains a power boost as he uses his staff to fire his Change Binbo like his Poor Beam. Binbogami is sent by Daimaou to turn the residents of a town into slaves with the promise to restore their wealth in return for their loyalty. The only civilians who didn't fall for his tricks were the Ninomiya family. Though Binbogami had the advantage against the Kakurangers and Ninjaman, they use his past life to break his spell before defeating him the Kakuranger Ball. Binbogami then enlarges before being destroyed by Samuraiman, Muteki Shogun, and Kakure Daishogun.

Others 
 Onbu-Obake (オンブオバケ Onbuokake, "Piggyback Ghost", Ohranger vs. Kakuranger): A powerful Youkai that was sealed in a temple away from the other Youkai by the ancient Kakurangers. Buldont brought him in for a contest he and his father Bacchus-Rage were having to see who can kill the OhRangers first. In a duel with Bara Haguruma, he piloted OHBlocker while Bara Gear piloted OHRanger Robo. Onbu-Obake could enlarge himself to the size of the Robos without the use of lightning. Onbu-Obake was a pervert/rapist and had a fetish for young, pretty girls, whom he could/would abduct to take their souls with a few licks from his extendable tongue. His human guise is a clown and his powers include possession and absorption attacks. He also scared Ganmazin away by showing him his spiritual form. However, the Kakurangers and Ohrangers joining forces places Onbu-Obake and Bara Haguruma at a disadvantage. After Buldont and Bacchus made a truce, Onbu-Obake envelops Bara Haguruma to form Onbu-Gear (オンブハグルマ Onbuhaguruma) who endured Oh-Blocker's attack but gets destroyed by Tackle Boy after the OHrangers' mecha use it to make the merged monster dizzy.

Episodes

Movie
The movie version of Ninja Sentai Kakuranger, directed by Shōhei Tōjō and written by Noboru Sugimura, premiered in Japan on April 16, 1994, at Toei Super Hero Fair '94. It was originally shown as a triple feature alongside Kamen Rider J and the feature film version of Blue SWAT. The villains in the movie consisted of the One-Eyed Brothers and Ōnyūdō. The movie was filmed between Episodes 7 and 8, but is actually set between episodes 8 and 9.

Crossovers
The Kakuranger team was the main focus in the 1994 3D featurette Super Sentai World, which features them teaming up with the four previous Super Sentai teams (Fiveman, Jetman, Zyuranger, and Dairanger).

Cast
/Red Saruder (voice)/Battle Saruder (voice): 
/White Kark (voice)/Battle Kark (voice): 
/Blue Logan (voice)/Battle Logan (voice): 
/Yellow Kumard (voice)/Battle Kumard (voice): 
/Black Gammer (voice)/Battle Gammer (voice): 
: 
: Akira Sakamoto
: 
: 
Junior: 
: 
: 
: 
, : 
:

Songs
Opening theme

Lyrics: 
Composition: 
Arrangement: Kenji Yamamoto
Artist: 
Takashi Tsushimi performed under the name "Tu Chee Chen", which is the Japanese approximation of his surname as read in Mandarin Chinese: Dōu Zhì Jiàn.

Ending theme

Lyrics: Hanadaiko Fuyamori
Composition: Takeshi Tsushimi
Arrangement: Kenji Yamamoto
Artist: Tu Chee Chen

International Broadcasts and Home Video
The series was aired in Thailand with a Thai dub on Channel 3 in 2000 despite the continuing popularity of the Power Rangers, but not all episodes were shown. It was also released on home video with a Thai dub.
The series aired in Taiwan on Taiwan Television with a Taiwanese Mandarin dub in 1997 under Shadow God Warriors. (影子神兵)
In Indonesia, the series aired with an Indonesian dub on RCTI in 2002 under Ninja Ranger, which is Toei's International English name that they distributed.
In North America, the series would receive a DVD release by Shout! Factory on November 1, 2016 in the original Japanese audio with English subtitles. It is the fourth Super Sentai series to be officially released in the region.

Notes

References

External links

 Official Ninja Sentai Kakuranger website 
 Official Shout! Factory page
 Official Shout Factory TV page
 Official Shout Graphenes Studios page

1994 Japanese television series debuts
1995 Japanese television series endings
Martial arts television series
Ninja fiction
Super Sentai
TV Asahi original programming
Japanese action television series
Japanese fantasy television series
Japanese science fiction television series
1990s Japanese television series
Yōkai in popular culture